Gijón Fútbol Femenino is a Spanish women's football club from Gijón established in 2000. As part of an agreement, the club acts de facto as UC Ceares's women's football section.

History
Gijón Fútbol Femenino was founded in 2000 by a group of sixteen women who disagreed with the work of their respective clubs in women's football. In its first season the club played in Regional league of Asturias and promoted to Segunda División by winning all its games played.

After topping its group of Segunda División for three consecutive seasons, Gijón FF promoted to the Superliga in 2005, after beating CD Nuestra Señora de Belén and UE L'Estartit in the promotion play-offs. In the debut at Superliga, Gijón ended last setting a negative record with one draw and 23 losses, and it was relegated.

The team gradually declined in subsequent years until it was relegated from Segunda División to the Regional League in 2015.

In that year 2015, Gijón FF signed a collaboration agreement with Tercera División club UC Ceares, for sharing La Cruz stadium and to create a youth academy for boys and girls.

One year after its relegation, Gijón FF promoted again to Segunda División and avoided the relegation in its coming-back season.

Season by season

References

External links
Gijón FF history at UC Ceares website

Women's football clubs in Spain
Association football clubs established in 2000
Sport in Gijón
2000 establishments in Spain
Football clubs in Asturias